Ladislav Olejník (8 May 1932 – 9 June 2022) was a Czech ice hockey player who also coached in Germany.

References

1932 births
2022 deaths
Czechoslovak ice hockey defencemen
Czechoslovak ice hockey coaches
Czech ice hockey coaches
Czechoslovak emigrants to West Germany
HC Kometa Brno players
Ice hockey people from Brno
Czech ice hockey defencemen
Germany men's national ice hockey team coaches
Czechoslovak expatriate ice hockey people
Czechoslovak expatriate sportspeople in West Germany
German ice hockey coaches